Agal or AGAL may also refer to:

Agal, an accessory
Agal, Iran, a village in East Azerbaijan Province, Iran
AGAL (Associaçom Galega da Língua), a reintegrationist association that seeks full normalization of Galician language
Adobe Graphics Assembly Language, a programming language for GPU shaders in Adobe Flash